Dragomir "Dragan" Tošić (8 November 1909 – 20 June 1985) was a Yugoslavian football defender.

References

External links

1909 births
1985 deaths
Yugoslav footballers
Yugoslavia international footballers
1930 FIFA World Cup players
OFK Beograd players
Yugoslav First League players
Association football defenders